Guido Andreozzi and Máximo González were the defending champions, but they chose not to compete together. Andreozzi chose to partner with Guillermo Durán, but lost in the quarterfinals to Rafael Matos and Marcelo Zormann. González chose not to compete.

Facundo Bagnis and Diego Schwartzman won the title by defeating André Ghem and Fabricio Neis 7–6(7–4), 5–7, [10–7] in the final.

Seeds

Draw

Draw

References
 Main Draw

Tetra Pak Tennis Cup - Doubles
2014 Doubles